Cihat Arman (1915 in Istanbul – May 14, 1994 in Istanbul), was a Turkish football goalkeeper and manager. He represented Turkey at the 1936 Summer Olympics and the 1948 Summer Olympics.

Biography 

Arman started playing club football at the age of 15 and made his debut for Ankaragücü. In 1936, he transferred to the Istanbul club Güneş. After the closure of this club, he moved to Fenerbahçe, where he played 308 games in total. He was nicknamed the "flying goalkeeper" due to his acrobatic and successful saves. The sight of him flying wearing his yellow shirt was the inspiration behind "The Yellow Canaries" (Sarı Kanaryalar in Turkish), the nickname for the football team of Fenerbahçe.

During World War II, international competitions were rarely held. So, Arman played only 13 games with the Turkey national football team during this time. After 1949 he served as the goalkeeper and captain for the team. He also coached the Turkish national team which qualified for the 1950 World Cup, thrashing Syria 7–0; but Turkey withdrew due to financial problems.

After Arman retired from active sport in 1950, he coached the Istanbul clubs Kasımpaşa, İstanbulspor, Yeşildirek, Beşiktaş and the national team (1950, 1957, 1958 and 1959).

References

External links
 
 
 

1915 births
Footballers from Istanbul
Turkish footballers
Turkey international footballers
Turkish sports journalists
1994 deaths
Gençlerbirliği S.K. footballers
Güneş S.K. players
Fenerbahçe S.K. footballers
Olympic footballers of Turkey
Footballers at the 1936 Summer Olympics
Footballers at the 1948 Summer Olympics
Fenerbahçe football managers
Turkey national football team managers
Beyoğlu SK managers
Beşiktaş J.K. managers
İstanbulspor managers
Kasımpaşa S.K. managers
Yeşildirek S.K. managers
Eskişehirspor managers
Mersin İdman Yurdu managers
Vefa S.K. managers
Burials at Aşiyan Asri Cemetery
Association football goalkeepers
Turkish football managers